Pierre S. V. Hamot House is a historic home located in Erie, Erie County, Pennsylvania.  The original section was built between 1827 and 1831, with the rear ell built during the 1870s. It is a two-story brick dwelling in a vernacular Federal style.

It sits on a Pennsylvania bluestone foundation and has a low-pitched roof.  It was rehabilitated by the Second Century Foundation.  It is the earliest surviving brick residence in Erie.

It was added to the National Register of Historic Places in 1991.

References

Houses on the National Register of Historic Places in Pennsylvania
Federal architecture in Pennsylvania
Houses completed in 1831
Houses in Erie, Pennsylvania
National Register of Historic Places in Erie County, Pennsylvania